The St. Norbert Green Knights football program is the intercollegiate American football team for St. Norbert College, located in the U.S. state of Wisconsin. The team competes in the NCAA Division III and is a member of the Midwest Conference. St. Norbert's first football team was fielded in 1931. The team plays its home games at the 2,454-seat Schneider Stadium in De Pere, Wisconsin.

The Green Knights have been coached by Dan McCarty since 2015. He was the defensive coordinator until the previous Green Knights coach elected to resign from his position. McCarty previously coached the defense at the University of Wisconsin–Stout.

Coaching history 
St. Norbert has had 11 head coaches in their history. No teams were fielded in 1943, 1944, or 1945 due to World War II. Additionally, no team was fielded in 2020 due to the COVID-19 pandemic.

Conference affiliation 

 Independent (1931–1946)
 Midlands Conference (1947–1953)
 Independent (1954–1983)
 Midwest Conference (1984–2020)
 Northern Athletics Collegiate Conference (2021–present)

Championships

Conference championships 
The Green Knights have won 19 conference championships (15 outright, 4 shared), despite being an Independent for 43 seasons.  St. Norbert was a member of the Midlands Conference from 1947–1953, winning two championships in that time, which was tied for the most with Loras College before the conference disbanded.  During a 36 season stint in the Midwest Conference, the Green Knights won the championship 17 times.

† Co-champions

Undefeated regular seasons 
St. Norbert has finished the regular season undefeated nine times. Of the undefeated seasons, four (1946, 1950, 1952, 1957) were before there was a postseason to determine a champion.  In the playoff era, the Green Knights finished the regular season undefeated five times (2000, 2003, 2006, 2007, 2015) before ultimately losing a game in the playoffs. In 1946, St. Norbert received votes in the final AP Poll to finish the season ranked #29 in all of college football, right behind Northwestern and just ahead of Kentucky.

Postseason games

NCAA Division III playoffs 
St. Norbert has made the NCAA Division III playoff field 13 times, with the first appearance being in 1989.  The Green Knights have advanced to the Second Round on two occasions, the first time in 2003 after a double overtime victory over Simpson College by a score of 26–20, and most recently in 2018 after a 31–7 win over Trine University.

Lambeau Field games
In 1982 and 1983, St. Norbert hosted Fordham, Vince Lombardi's alma mater, in two tilts, benefiting the Vince Lombardi Cancer Foundation at Lambeau Field. The first was held on November 20, 1982 and the second on November 19, 1983. The first game, a 14–10 St. Norbert win, drew 5,119 people. The second game, an 18–9 St. Norbert win, drew 842 people.

References

External links
 

 
American football teams established in 1931
1931 establishments in Wisconsin